Dhamri is a village in Meharama CD block in Godda subdivision of Godda district in the Indian state of Jharkhand.

Geography

Location

Overview
Rajmahal coalfield is shown in the map. The entire area is overwhelmingly rural with only small pockets of urbanisation.

Note: The full screen map is interesting. All places marked on the map are linked and you can easily move on to another page of your choice. Enlarge the map to see what else is there – one gets railway links, many more road links and so on.

Demographics
According to the 2011 Census of India, Dhamri Saheb had a total population of 696. The total number of literate persons in Dhamri Saheb was 305 (55.25% of the population over 6 years). Dhamri Gopalram had a total population of 51. The total number of literate persons in Dhamri Gopalram was 108 (32.41% of the population over 6 years).

Education
S.R.T. College, Dhamri was established a visionary and education enthusiast Shri Raghunandan Tiwari in 1961. It is a constituent college of Sido Kanhu Murmu University. Subjects taught are: English, Hindi, Urdu, Sanskrit, political science, history, sociology, geography, economics, philosophy, physics, chemistry, mathematics, botany and zoology. It offers both honours and general courses in arts and science.

References

Villages in Godda district